John Esmond Campbell Macrae  (born 8 December 1932) is a retired British diplomat.

Macrae was schooled at the Sheikh Bagh preparatory in Kashmir and Fettes College, and completed his university education at Christ Church, Oxford. He earned a DPhil in Radiation Chemistry from Oxford in 1960 and, before joining HM Diplomatic Service, began his career in the Atomic Energy and Disarmament Department of the Foreign Office.

Macrae was Head of Cultural Relations at the Foreign Office (1980-1985); Ambassador to Senegal (1985-1990); and finally Ambassador to Morocco (1990-1992).

Honours
  Companion of the Order of St Michael and St George (CMG) - 1986

References

Living people
1932 births
Members of HM Diplomatic Service
Alumni of Christ Church, Oxford
Companions of the Order of St Michael and St George
Ambassadors of the United Kingdom to Senegal
Ambassadors of the United Kingdom to Morocco
20th-century British diplomats